Howkins Inlet is an ice-filled inlet which recedes southwest for  between Cape Brooks and Lamb Point, along the east coast of Palmer Land, Antarctica. It was discovered and photographed from the air in December 1940 by the United States Antarctic Service. During 1947 it was photographed from the air by the Ronne Antarctic Research Expedition under Finn Ronne, who in conjunction with the Falkland Islands Dependencies Survey (FIDS) charted it from the ground. The inlet was named by the FIDS for Gordon Howkins, a meteorologist with the FIDS base at Deception Island in 1944–45.

References

Inlets of Palmer Land